Horneline Creek Provincial Park is a provincial park in far northern British Columbia, Canada.  It is located west of the Kechika River about 130 km south of Lower Post and 30 km north of Denetiah Provincial Park and southwest of the community of Liard River.

The park protects mountain goat habitat, namely a canyon formed by Horneline Creek cutting through a glacial terrace, and is accessed via the Kechika River, with a 250 km boat trip from Fireside.  The Davie Trail, a historic trail from Fort Ware to Lower Post, traverses part of the Kechika River next to the Rocky Mountain Trench.

Flora and fauna
The steep-walled canyon formed by Horneline Creek's course through the glacial terrace has exposed a natural mineral lick, attracting 60 to 75 goats at a time.  Grasslands and groups of aspen line the canyon's rim.

See also
List of British Columbia provincial parks

References

Liard Country
Cassiar Mountains
Provincial parks of British Columbia
Canyons and gorges of British Columbia
1989 establishments in British Columbia
Protected areas established in 1989